Events from the year 1936 in Scotland.

Incumbents 

 Secretary of State for Scotland and Keeper of the Great Seal – Sir Godfrey Collins until 29 October; then Walter Elliot

Law officers 
 Lord Advocate – Thomas Mackay Cooper
 Solicitor General for Scotland – Albert Russell until June; then James Reid

Judiciary 
 Lord President of the Court of Session and Lord Justice General – Lord Normand
 Lord Justice Clerk – Lord Aitchison
 Chairman of the Scottish Land Court – Lord MacGregor Mitchell

Events 
 27–31 January – The Combined Scottish Universities by-election sees former UK Prime Minister Ramsay MacDonald returned to the House of Commons
 March – Scottish Ornithologists' Club founded
 8 March – Cartoon characters The Broons and Oor Wullie first appear in The Sunday Post
 7 June – First outdoors radio broadcast in Gaelic, a religious service from Iona Abbey, transmitted by the BBC
 10 June – First timetabled service to Barra Airport, on Traigh Mhòr beach, offered by Northern & Scottish Airways
 23 September – Prince Albert and his wife, the Duchess of York, open a new wing of Aberdeen Royal Infirmary while his brother Edward VIII meets Wallis Simpson at Aberdeen railway station en route to Balmoral Castle
 29 October – Kincardine Bridge opened across the Firth of Forth
 November – Punjabi-born Dr. Jainti Dass Saggar becomes the first non-White local authority councillor in Scotland, being elected for the Labour Party in Dundee
 20 November – The Maybury roadhouse opens on the outskirts of Edinburgh, a notable example of Art Deco by Paterson & Broom

Births 
 7 January – Hunter Davies, writer
 10 February
 James Alexander Gordon, radio announcer (died 2014 in England)
 Euan MacKie, archaeologist and anthropologist
 11 February – Sylvia Wishart, landscape artist (died 2008)
 4 March – Jim Clark, motor racing driver (killed 1968 in motor racing accident at Hockenheimring, Germany)
 26 March – John Malcolm, film and television actor (died 2008)  
 17 April – Rona Lightfoot, bagpiper and singer
 24 April – Davie Sneddon, footballer (died 2020)
 26 April – Pat Quinn, footballer (died 2020)
 28 April – Kenneth White, poet, academic and writer
 5 May – John Maxton, politician
 8 May – George Mulhall, footballer (died 2018 in England)
 17 May – James Gordon, Baron Gordon of Strathblane, businessman and politician (died 2020)
 27 May – Eric Anderson, born William Kinloch Anderson, educator, Provost of Eton College (died 2020)
 10 June – Marion Chesney, novelist (died 2019)
 25 June – Roy Williamson, folk musician (died 1990)
 26 June – Robert Maclennan, Liberal Democrat politician (died 2020)
 27 June – Robin Hall, folk singer (died 1998)
 5 July – James Mirrlees, economist, winner of the 1996 Nobel Memorial Prize in Economic Sciences (died 2018 in England)
 9 July – Richard Wilson, actor
 18 September – Hugh Fraser, retailer (died 1987)
 6 October – Sandra Voe, actress
 21 November – James A. Mackay, writer and philatelist (died 2007)
 25 November – William McIlvanney, novelist, short story writer and poet (died 2015)
 1 December – Crawford Fairbrother, high jumper (died 1986)
 2 December – Eileen McCallum actress
 26 December – Tormod MacGill-Eain, Scottish Gaelic comedian, novelist, poet, musician and broadcaster (died 2017)
 Stewart Conn, poet and playwright
 Brian Quinn, economist and Chairman of Celtic F.C.

Deaths 
 6 February – Charles Bellany Thomson, international footballer (born 1878)
 23 February – William Adamson, trade unionist and politician, Leader of the Labour Party (1917–1921) and Secretary of State for Scotland in 1924 and 1929-1931 (born 1863)
 2 March – Donald Alexander Mackenzie, journalist and folklorist (born 1873)
 9 April – William Beardmore, 1st Baron Invernairn, industrialist (born 1856)
 25 May – Sir Robert Sangster Rait, historian, Historiographer Royal (born 1874)
 4 November – John Henry Lorimer portrait and genre painter (born 1856)
 22 November – Sir Fitzroy Maclean, 10th Baronet, soldier and clan chief (born 1835)
 2 December – Dugald Christie, missionary in China, founder of the Shengjing Clinic and Mukden Medical College (born 1885)
 Joseph Morris Henderson, Glaswegian landscape, portrait, genre and coastal scenery oil and watercolour painter (born 1863)

The arts
 Edwin Muir publishes Scott and Scotland.

See also 
 Timeline of Scottish history
 1936 in Northern Ireland

References 

 
Years of the 20th century in Scotland
Scotland
1930s in Scotland